Ronald C Tress, CBE, (11 January 1915 – 28 September 2006) was a British economist.

He studied Economics 1933–36 at University College, Southampton taking a University of London external degree.

Beginning in 1941 he was an economic adviser to the British War Cabinet for four years.
He became a Professor of Political Economy at the University of Bristol in 1951.
He was Master of Birkbeck College, University of London from 1968 to 1977.
He was elected a Fellow of Birkbeck College, University of London in 1977.
He became director of the Leverhulme Trust of 1978.

References

Further reading

1915 births
2006 deaths
Academics of the University of Bristol
Masters of Birkbeck, University of London
British economists